108 Kalthur  is a village in the southern state of Karnataka, India. It is located in the Udupi taluk of Udupi district in Karnataka.

The village is near Hebri (about 5 km) and lies on the Hebri Brahmavar State Highway.
A government run primary school up to 4th standard exists.
There are so many shops & milk dairy & restaurant also there.

Santhekatte is the nearby centre where the government school up to 7th standard exists. Santekatte also has a cashew factory, a rice mill and a few shops, a post office, a farmers co-operative society, and a primary health centre.

See also
 Udupi
 Districts of Karnataka

References

External links
 http://Udupi.nic.in/

Villages in Udupi district